Eugnosta telemacana is a species of moth of the family Tortricidae. It is found in Brazil (Parana).

The wingspan is about 20 mm. The ground colour of the posterior portion of the wing is snow white, with grey lines and costal spots. The hindwings are brownish with dark brown diffuse strigulation.

References

Moths described in 2007
Eugnosta